National Democratic Youth (NDU) was the youth organization of the now-defunct Swedish political party National Democrats.

History 
NDU was formed during spring 2002 and has taken a strong stance against multiculturalism, communism, homosexuality and feminism striving for a nation characterized by Nordic culture, tradition and national solidarity.

In 2003 the organisation performed a violent attack against the Gay pride-festival in Stockholm, where they began throwing bottles and beating the participators of the parade, this later resulted in the imprisonment of the chairman Marc Abramsson on the terms of battery and rioting.

NDU now suffered from internal conflicts and started a period of reconstruction when Andreas Wallentin replaced the leadership. A year later he resigned to have time for studies and to work as a writer for the party's newspaper Nationell Idag (National Today). Robert Almgren took over and continued the reformation, leading it out of all the setbacks and making it a prominent and rapid-growing youth organisation again, creating new divisions all over the country. The organization disbanded together with the party in April 2014.

Organisation 
The members of NDU concentrated most of their work on the local level, in their respective municipal organisations. These divisions were grouped together in regional districts with an organizer controlling the district's combined effort. The number of members was kept secret for safety reasons.

A congress was held annually to elect a chairman as highest authority of the youth league. In turn he appointed organizers and representatives for the regional groups. All the representatives together formed a national advisory council. In consultation between the chairman and the council the political manifesto and stance in factual matters was decided, in accordance with the parent party's ideological guidelines.

List of chairpersons 
Marc Abramsson, 2001–2004
Andreas Wallentin, 2004–2005
Robert Almgren, 2005–2006
Patrik Forsén, 2006–2007
Andreas Nyberg, 2007–2009

External links 
 Official site (in Swedish)

Youth wings of political parties in Sweden
Youth organizations established in 2002
2002 establishments in Sweden
Youth wings of fascist parties